Terrible Swift Sword: Battle of Gettysburg Game (often abbreviated TSS) is a grand tactical regimental level board wargame published by Simulations Publications, Inc. (SPI) in 1976 that simulates the Battle of Gettysburg during the American Civil War. A second edition was published by TSR in 1986.

Description
TSS, with over 1000 counters, is classified as a "monster" wargame; as one of the largest board games ever produced, it often takes longer to play than the actual 3-day battle of July 1–3, 1863. The game's title comes from the third line of the Battle Hymn of the Republic: "He hath loosed the fateful lightning of His terrible swift sword."

Components
The game box contains:
Three  22" x 34" paper hex grid maps scaled at 120 yd (110 m) per hex
32-page rulebook
 2000 die-cut counters
 historical situation briefing booklet
 various play aids
 six-sided die

Gameplay
Each daylight turn represents 20 minutes of the battle; each night is divided into 8 turns representing 1 hour each. The game includes several scenarios that can be played separately:
The First Day (29 turns)
The Second Day (40 turns)
Little Round Top (6 turns)
The Third Day (Pickett's Charge) (21 turns)
Or the players can simulate the entire battle in the "Grand Battle Game: The Three Days of Gettysburg", which takes 149 turns, requiring about 50 hours of playing time.

When a unit suffers losses, it does so in steps of 100 men. This also affects morale, since each unit is rated for how many strength points it can lose before its Brigade Combat Effectiveness is destroyed. Such a unit cannot initiate melee and is more susceptible to rout. Each side has leaders as well at the Army, Corps and Division level (and Confederates also have Brigade leaders.) Units must stay within a certain distance of their leader in order to move.

Only two units of up to 8 strength points can be stacked on a hex, and only the top unit can fire and take damage.

Each turn begins with a number of phases:
First player Offensive artillery
Other player Defensive artillery
First player Movement
Other player Artillery fire (any units that have not already fired)
First player Artillery fire (any units that have not already fired)
Other player retreats units threatened by melee
First player Melee
First player attempts to rally routed units
The turn ends with the second player repeating the above steps.

Publication history
Terrible Swift Swords was designed by Richard Berg, with graphic design by Redmond A. Simonsen, and was published by SPI in July 1976 in both double "flat-pack" and "soap box" editions. The game immediately rose to #4 on SPI's Top Ten Bestseller list, and stayed in the Top Ten for the next eight months. Sales of the game reached 30,000 units.

TSS was the first of what would become a series of eight SPI wargames about the American Civil War, called Great Battles of the American Civil War (GBACW). 

TSR took over SPI in 1982 and republished a number of popular SPI titles in new TSR packaging. This included Terrible Swift Swords, which was republished with artwork by Larry Elmore in 1986. Like its predecessor, this edition also sold over 30,000 units. 

As a continuation of the GBACW series, TSR published the separate American Civil War game Rebel Sabers: Civil War Cavalry Battles in 1986. One of the four scenarios, "Dutch Roads", a simulation of a cavalry battle during Gettysburg, can be linked to gameplay during TSS.

Nearly twenty years after the publication of TSS, original designer Richard Berg redesigned the game, which was released in 1995 by GMT Games as The Three Days of Gettysburg, with artwork by Rodger B. MacGowan.

Reception
In his 1977 book The Comprehensive Guide to Board Wargaming, Nicholas Palmer called the game "strongly tactical in emphasis, with particularly detailed rules for firing different types of weapons." Palmer concluded, "A magnificent simulation, but far from swift."

In Issue 54 of Moves, Steve List warned of the "many, many detailed rules" and called the game "dauntingly complex." He concluded by giving the game a grade of B, saying, ""beware of the time it takes to play. A solid weekend of diligent activity might suffice to reach a conclusion in a single day scenario, but the whole battle cannot be played out in one sitting."

In The Guide to Simulations/Games for Education and Training, Martin Campion commented on its use as a classroom aid, saying, "The duration of the grand battle version of tbis game makes it unlikely that any class could play it in this way, but much can be learned from shorter playings." Campion advised that if the teacher acts as referee and knows the rules, the students don't need to be experts. He further advised "teach the players how to move, how to change formations, and a few other things. Then get started on a series of made-up small battles [...] After three or four short preparatory battles, give them one of the shorter scenarios of Gettysburg to play out."

In the 1980 book The Complete Book of Wargames, game designer Jon Freeman commented "The game is immense, but so is the enjoyment." He noted "The historical situation provides many opportunities for both players to exercise their initiative in bold strokes of tactical brilliance." Freeman concluded by giving the game an Overall Evaluation of "Very Good", saying, "It's more playable that you would expect of a monster this size.  

Wargame Academy considers TSS to be the "patriarch" of all subsequent wargames and computer games about Gettysburg. The game was rated as "simple enough for high playability yet with lots of room for maneuver and player strategy." 

TSS was chosen for inclusion in the 2007 book Hobby Games: The 100 Best.

Awards
At the 1977 Origins Awards, Terrible Swift Sword won the Charles S. Roberts Award for  "Best Tactical Game of 1976". TSS was also a finalist for "Best Graphics and Physical Systems of 1976."

Other reviews
Fire & Movement #5, #6, #10, #53, #58, #83, #89
Grenadier #32
Line of Departure #6
Phoenix #11 
The Wargamer Vol.1 #3 and Vol1. #5
1980 Games 100 in Games
Games & Puzzles #61, 72

References 

American Civil War board wargames
Board games introduced in 1976
Board wargames with artwork by Rodger B. MacGowan
Origins Award winners
Richard Berg games
Simulations Publications games
TSR, Inc. games
Wargames introduced in 1976